The 2021 South Carolina Gamecocks football team represented the University of South Carolina in the 2021 NCAA Division I FBS football season. The season marked the Gamecocks' 128th overall season, and 30th as a member of the SEC East Division. The Gamecocks played their home games at Williams–Brice Stadium in Columbia, South Carolina, and were led by first-year head coach Shane Beamer.

In Shane Beamer's first year as head coach, South Carolina played in its first bowl game since 2018 and won its first bowl game since 2017. They defeated North Carolina in the 2021 Duke's Mayo Bowl 38–21.

Background

Previous season

After opening the 2020 season with losses to Tennessee and Florida, the Gamecocks defeated Vanderbilt on October 10th. On October 17th, they beat No. 15 Auburn for the first time since 1933. The win over the Tigers would be the highlight of the season, as the Gamecocks would lose all of their remaining games, including losses to LSU (24–52) and Texas A&M (3–48). After giving up 59 points to Ole Miss, Will Muschamp was terminated. Offensive coordinator Mike Bobo finished the season as interim head coach; he would lose the remaining final 3 games by a combined score of 44–103. It was the Gamecocks' worst season since 1999.

New head coach announced
On December 6, 2020, Oklahoma assistant head coach Shane Beamer was announced as the Gamecocks 36th head coach. A former Gamecock assistant coach and recruiting coordinator under Steve Spurrier from 2007 to 2010, he is also the son of long time Virginia Tech Head coach Frank Beamer. Beamer was born in Charleston, South Carolina, after graduating from Virginia Tech, he was a graduate assistant at Georgia Tech, and Tennessee, before becoming an assistant coach at Mississippi State. Beamers other stops as an assistant included Virginia Tech and Georgia. Notable recruits signed during Beamer's time as recruiting coordinator at South Carolina included Alshon Jeffery, Stephon Gilmore, and D. J. Swearinger.

Beamer cleaned out the staff from the Muschamp era, hiring Marcus Satterfield from the Carolina Panthers as Offensive coordinator and quarterbacks coach, Clayton White from NC State as Defensive coordinator and inside linebackers coach, and a slew of other hires including Pete Lembo as Associate head coach/special teams coordinator and Hammond coach and former Gamecock QB Erik Kimrey as Tight ends coach. Defensive backs coach Torrian Gray was hired away from Florida, and Wide receivers coach Justin Stepp was hired away from Arkansas.

Preseason

Offseason departures

Personnel

Coaching staff

Notable support staff

Roster

Schedule

Game summaries

vs. Eastern Illinois

at East Carolina

at #2 Georgia

vs. Kentucky

vs. Troy

at Tennessee

vs. Vanderbilt

Rankings

References

South Carolina
 South Carolina Gamecocks football seasons
 Duke's Mayo Bowl champion seasons
South Carolina Gamecocks football